Thomas Christopher John Pursglove (born 5 November 1988) is a British politician serving as Minister of State for Disabled People, Health and Work. He served as Minister of State for Immigration from September 2022 to October 2022. He served as Minister of State for Crime and Policing from July 2022 to September. A member of the Conservative Party, he has been the Member of Parliament (MP) for Corby since May 2015. Aged 26 at the time of his election, he was the youngest Conservative MP.

Early life and career
Pursglove was born in Kettering on 5 November 1988. He was educated at Sir Christopher Hatton School, a state comprehensive school in the market town of Wellingborough in Northamptonshire, where he grew up, and graduated from Queen Mary University of London in 2010 with a politics degree.

In 2007, at the age of 18, Pursglove became the youngest councillor in the country when he was elected for Croyland Ward on Wellingborough Borough Council. The election saw the Conservative Party extend their dominance in Wellingborough, winning 30 of the 36 posts available and notably seeing three teenagers elected. Pursglove was re-elected in 2011, but did not stand again in 2015.

In addition to his role as a councillor, he worked as a parliamentary assistant to the Conservative MP for Daventry Chris Heaton-Harris and worked with the Conservative MP for Wellingborough Peter Bone. Prior to being elected as an MP, Pursglove was deputy chairman of the Wellingborough Conservative Association.

Parliamentary career
Pursglove was elected as a Member of Parliament for Corby in the 2015 general election with a majority of 2,412 (4.3%). He won back for the Conservatives a seat that had been lost to Labour in a 2012 by-election after the former Conservative MP Louise Mensch stood down.

In July 2016, following Theresa May's appointment as Prime Minister, Pursglove was appointed as Parliamentary Private Secretary to Robert Goodwill, the Minister of State for Immigration at the Home Office.

Pursglove was re-elected at the 2017 general election with a slightly increased majority of 2,960 votes.

In February 2018, following the announcement that Northamptonshire County Council had brought in a section 114 notice, putting it in special measures following a crisis in its finances, Pursglove was one of seven local MPs who released a statement arguing that the problems with the authority were down to mismanagement from the Conservative councillors who led it rather than funding cuts from the Conservative Government. They further argued that government commissioners should take over the running of the council.

On 27 July 2018, following Ben Bradley's resignation over disagreements with the government's policy on Brexit, Pursglove was selected to replace him as Vice Chairman of the Conservative Party for Youth. In February 2019, fellow Conservative MP Nigel Huddleston replaced Pursglove in the role following his resignation over the approach of the party towards Brexit.

In August 2019, Pursglove was appointed as an assistant government whip in the first Johnson ministry. In September 2021, he was appointed Parliamentary Under-Secretary of State for Immigration, Compliance and Courts during the cabinet reshuffle, a role held jointly between the Home Office and Ministry of Justice.

In October 2022, following the resignation of Liz Truss as Prime Minister, Pursglove announced that he would be supporting previous Prime Minister Boris Johnson in the subsequent leadership election.

Political views

Criticism of the European Union
Pursglove was one of the founders of Grassroots Out, an organisation which advocated United Kingdom withdrawal from the European Union. The organisation was led by politicians from a range of political parties, including fellow Conservative MP Peter Bone and Labour MP Kate Hoey. In February 2016 it was announced that Pursglove and fellow Conservative MP Peter Bone would be speakers at the UKIP Spring Conference. Although rare for representatives of rival political parties to appear at such events, they argued any role they had there would be as representatives of the Grassroots Out group.

In April 2016, he was criticised for taking payments of £21,750 from the Grassroots Out campaign, of which he was chief executive, which some fellow campaigners argued should have been donated to further campaigning. However, he argued his work had "keep costs to a minimum, allowing us to spend the maximum amount on campaigning", rather than hiring outside expertise. In May 2016, he stated that, given the choice, he would ultimately prefer to see Britain leave the EU than his party secure another majority at the 2020 election, but also said that he was a 'loyal Conservative' and had no desire to defect to UKIP.

The environment
Pursglove has expressed scepticism about human influence on climate change and advocated abolishing the Department of Energy and Climate Change. In Parliament, he voted to reduce regulation on fracking and, in light of this, was criticised by environmental campaigners for his constituency party having taken donations from energy firms. He has questioned public spending on reducing carbon emissions in the UK on the grounds that countries like China produce more emissions and therefore needed to take more action. Between 2013 and 2016, Pursglove was director, alongside Chris Heaton-Harris, of Together Against Wind, a lobbying company that  helped move Government policy against favouring the installation of onshore wind power.

The Hunting Act 2004
In 2017, Pursglove expressed opposition to the Hunting Act 2004 in a written response to constituents. In this letter Pursglove took the position that he would vote to repeal the Act if such a vote were to be held. In a subsequent letter to constituents, a neutral position was presented, wherein the Conservative Party manifesto position from the 2019 United Kingdom general election was noted.

References

External links

1988 births
Alumni of Queen Mary University of London
Conservative Party (UK) MPs for English constituencies
Living people
People from Wellingborough
UK MPs 2015–2017
UK MPs 2017–2019
UK MPs 2019–present
British Eurosceptics